The Pinkham House is a historic house at 79 Winthrop Avenue in the Wollaston Heights neighborhood of Quincy, Massachusetts.  The -story wood-frame house was built in the 1870s by George Pinkham, the manager of the Wollaston Land Company, which developed Wollaston Heights, and is the only house in Quincy that has a direct association with the Pinkham family.  The house is a handsome example of Second Empire styling, with a dormered flared mansard roof, quoined corners, and bracketed eaves.

The house was listed on the National Register of Historic Places in 1989.

See also
National Register of Historic Places listings in Quincy, Massachusetts

References

Houses in Quincy, Massachusetts
Second Empire architecture in Massachusetts
Houses completed in 1870
National Register of Historic Places in Quincy, Massachusetts
Houses on the National Register of Historic Places in Norfolk County, Massachusetts